Sandy Lake is a lake in Trent Lakes township, Peterborough County, Ontario, Canada. It is about 5 km west of the community of Buckhorn, 1 km east of Lakehurst, and 25 km north of Peterborough. The lake is typically clear of turbidity and has a slight green color which results from the minerals present in the spring-fed water that feeds the lake. A small creek connects Sandy Lake to the Trent-Severn waterway at Buckhorn Lake. The majority of residences are seasonal.

See also
List of lakes in Ontario

References
 National Resources Canada

Lakes of Peterborough County